"All I Really Want" is a song by English Italy-based singer Kim Lukas. The song was released in 1999 as the lead single from Lukas's debut album, With a K. The song reached the top 10 in Austria, Canada, Denmark, and Italy.

Background
"All I Really Want" is a dance song played in 128.4 beats per measure and in an E minor key.

Lukas had the song sent to Dbone music through her producer, Roberto Turatti. Kim Lukas states on the lyrics of the song, "Most of my lyrics are based on general situations that people experience but also some of my own personal experiences." Kim also said she was incredible with the song's chart performance; "It seemed like a dream at the time."

The song's music video was made by BlissCo Media and released by BMG and Jive.

Track listings
CD maxi – Europe (1999)
 "All I Really Want" (Eiffel 65 radio edit) – 3:45
 "All I Really Want" (Shaft Club radio edit) – 3:25
 "All I Really Want" (Shaft Club) – 4:58
 "All I Really Want" (original mix) – 5:08
 "All I Really Want" (Eiffel 65 remix) – 5:31
 "All I Really Want" (Shaft Club mix) – 4:45

Charts

Weekly charts

Year-end charts

References

1999 debut singles
1999 songs
Jive Records singles
British electronic dance music songs